John Patrick Breen (1898 – 5 February 1966) was an Australian politician. Born in Kalgoorlie, Western Australia, he attended Catholic schools and then the University of Sydney. He became a publican and organiser of the Australian Workers' Union before being elected to the Australian House of Representatives in 1940 representing the seat of Calare for the Labor Party. He defeated sitting Country Party MP Harold Thorby. He held the seat until his defeat by Liberal John Howse in 1946, after which he became Trade Commissioner to the Middle East from 1946 to 1948. He died in 1966.

References

Australian Labor Party members of the Parliament of Australia
Members of the Australian House of Representatives for Calare
Members of the Australian House of Representatives
1898 births
1966 deaths
People from Kalgoorlie
Australian trade unionists
Date of birth missing
Place of death missing
20th-century Australian politicians